Arthur Roper (12 January 1890 – 21 June 1956) was an English cricketer. He played for Gloucestershire between 1920 and 1921.

References

1890 births
1956 deaths
English cricketers
Gloucestershire cricketers
Cricketers from Bristol